Marie C. Damour is an American diplomat who is the current Ambassador to Fiji, serving concurrently as the ambassador to Kiribati, Nauru, Tonga, and Tuvalu. She previously served as Consul General of the U.S. Consulate General in Ho Chi Minh City, Vietnam.

Early life and education
Damour earned her B.A. from the College of William and Mary.

Career
Damour is a career member of the Senior Foreign Service, with the rank of Minister-Counselor. Her positions within the Department of State include the Director of the Office of Maritime Southeast Asian Affairs in the State Department's Bureau of East Asia and Pacific Affairs; Director of the Office of Policy Coordination and Public Affairs in the State Department's Bureau of Consular Affairs; and the Deputy Chief of Mission, as well as Chargé d'Affaires ad interim at the U.S. Embassy in Wellington, New Zealand. She also served as Minister Counselor for Consular Affairs at the U.S. Embassy in Brasilia, Brazil; the Chief of Non-Immigrant Visa Services, and then Chief of Visa Services at the U.S. Embassy in London, England; the Consular Chief at the U.S. Embassy in Baghdad, Iraq, and the U.S. Consulate General in Ho Chi Minh City, Vietnam.

Ambassador to Fiji
On May 25, 2022, President Joe Biden nominated Damour to be the United States Ambassador to Fiji, Kiribati, Nauru, Tonga and Tuvalu. Hearings on her nomination were held before the Senate Foreign Relations Committee on July 13, 2022. The committee favorably reported her nomination on July 19, 2022. On August 4, 2022, her nomination was confirmed by the full United States Senate via voice vote. Damour presented her credentials to President of Fiji Ratu Wiliame Katonivere on November 24, 2022, President of Kiribati Taneti Maamau on November 30, 2022, King of Tonga Tupou VI on December 6, 2022, President of Nauru Russ Kun on February 8, 2023, and Governor-General of Tuvalu Tofiga Vaevalu Falani on February 15, 2023.

Personal life
Damour speaks French, Vietnamese, and Portuguese.

References

|-

|-

|-

|-

Year of birth missing (living people)
Living people
21st-century American diplomats
Ambassadors of the United States to Fiji
Ambassadors of the United States to Kiribati
Ambassadors of the United States to Nauru
Ambassadors of the United States to Tonga
Ambassadors of the United States to Tuvalu
American women diplomats
College of William & Mary alumni
United States Department of State officials
United States Foreign Service personnel